Lakhish River (Naḥal Lakhish) is a river in Israel that flows into the Mediterranean Sea at the city of Ashdod. It is also known as Wadi Kabiba (inland section) and Wadi Sukhrir (Ashdod section) in Arabic.

History
The basin square is 1,020 km and the length is about 70 km. The river sources are in the southern West Bank and the stream often floods during the rainy season.

The river is polluted by industrial waste and sewage, due in part to its location separating the industrial zone and port from the rest of Ashdod. A rehabilitation program has been performed over the last years with mixed success.

See also
Geography of Israel

References

Rivers of Israel
Rivers of the West Bank
Ashdod
Environmental issues in Israel
International rivers of Asia